This is a list of the etymology of many street names in the London district of Lisson Grove most broadly defined which has the occasionally contested limits of St John's Wood Road: north, Park Road and Baker Street: east, Marylebone Road: south and Edgware Road/Maida Vale: west. This is alternatively the northern half of Marylebone, excluding the long dissociated St John's Wood, especially in station-centric terms common in the 21st century. Well within these borders is Marylebone station.

In oldest terms Marylebone was the medieval parish, see map at Ossulstone. It forms six ecclesiastical (Anglican) parishes today – two cover this area.

References
Citations

Sources

Streets in the City of Westminster
Lists of United Kingdom placename etymology
Lisson Grove
England geography-related lists